The Guthrie Theater is a center for theater performance, production, education, and professional training in Minneapolis, Minnesota. The following is a chronological list of the plays and performances that it has produced or presented. Production information from 1963 through the 2005–06 season is sourced primarily from The Guthrie Theater: Images, History, and Inside Stories and The Guthrie Theater.

1960s
Artistic Directors:  Tyrone Guthrie (1963–66), Douglas Campbell (1966–67), no named artistic director (1968–69)

Stages: Thrust stage on Vineland Place, Crawford Livingston Theater (second thrust stage) in St. Paul, The Other Place

Directors (Vineland Place):  Joseph Anthony, Edward Payson Call, Douglas Campbell, Tyrone Guthrie, Robert Lanchester, Philip Manor, John Olin, Stephen Porter, Mel Shapiro, Alan Schneider, Maurice Valency

Actors (partial listing): Paul Ballantyne, Fran Bennett, Raye Birk, Zoe Caldwell, Douglas Campbell, Helen Carey, Len Cariou, Patricia Conolly, Hume Cronyn, David Feldshuh, Rita Gam, Ellen Geer, Peter Michael Goetz, George Grizzard, Charles Keating, Linda Kelsey, James Lawless, Michael Moriarty, Robert Pastene, Richard Russell Ramos, Ken Ruta, Gale Sondergaard, Jessica Tandy

1963

Vineland Place
Hamlet – by William Shakespeare
The Miser – by Molière
The Three Sisters – by Anton Chekhov
Death of a Salesman – by Arthur Miller

1964

Vineland Place
Henry V – by William Shakespeare
Saint Joan – by George Bernard Shaw
The Glass Menagerie – by Tennessee Williams
Volpone – by Ben Jonson

1965

Vineland Place
Richard III – by William Shakespeare
The Way of the World – by William Congreve
The Cherry Orchard – by Anton Chekhov
The Caucasian Chalk Circle – by Bertolt Brecht
The Miser – by Molière

1966

Vineland Place
The Skin of Our Teeth – by Thornton Wilder
The Dance of Death – by August Strindberg
As You Like It – by William Shakespeare
The Doctor's Dilemma – by George Bernard Shaw
S.S. Glencairn – by Eugene O'Neill

1967

Vineland Place
The Shoemaker's Holiday – by Thomas Dekker
Thieves' Carnival – by Jean Anouilh
Harpers Ferry – by Barrie Stavis
The House of Atreus – based on Oresteia by Aeschylus, adapted by John Lewin
The Visit – by Friedrich Dürrenmatt adapted by Maurice Valency

1968

Vineland Place
Twelfth Night – by William Shakespeare
Serjeant Musgrave's Dance – by John Arden
The Master Builder – by Henrik Ibsen
The Resistible Rise of Arturo Ui – by Bertolt Brecht
Merton of the Movies – by Marc Connelly and George S. Kaufman
The House of Atreus – based on Oresteia by Aeschylus, adapted by John Lewin

Crawford Livingston Theater
She Stoops to Conquer –  by Oliver Goldsmith
Tango – by Sławomir Mrożek
Enrico IV – by Luigi Pirandello

The Other Place
Blood of an Englishman – by John Lewin
The Jealous Husband and The Flying Doctor – by Molière
Little Murders – by Jules Feiffer
Red Cross – by Sam Shepard
The Indian Wants the Bronx – by Israel Horovitz
The Man with the Flower in his Mouth – by Luigi Pirandello
Quirk – by Omar Shapli
Halloween – by Leonard Melfi
Charlie – by Sławomir Mrożek
Brecht on Brecht – by Bertolt Brecht

On tour
The House of Atreus – based on Oresteia by Aeschylus, adapted by John Lewin
The Resistible Rise of Arturo Ui – by Bertolt Brecht

1969

Vineland Place
Julius Caesar – by William Shakespeare
The Beauty Part – by S. J. Perelman
The Homecoming – by Harold Pinter
Mourning Becomes Electra – by Eugene O'Neill
Uncle Vanya – by Anton Chekhov

Crawford Livingston Theater
The Alchemist – by Ben Jonson
Ardele – by Jean Anouilh

The Other Place
The Measures Taken –  by Bertolt Brecht
The Dutchman – Leroi Jones
A Slight Ache – by Harold Pinter
Krapp's Last Tape – by Samuel Beckett
The Hostage – by Brendan Behan
The Ghost Dancer – by Fred Gaines

1970s
Artistic Directors: no named artistic director (1970), Michael Langham (1971–77), Alvin Epstein (1978–80)

Stages: Thrust stage on Vineland Place, The Other Place, Guthrie 2 on the West Bank

Directors (Vineland Place): Rae Allen, Michael Bawtree, Robert Benedetti, Michael Blakemore, Len Cariou, Eric Christmas, Jon Cranney, Ron Daniels, Anatoly Efros, Alvin Epstein, David Feldshuh, Edward Gilbert, Thomas Gruenewald, Adrian Hall, Nick Havinga, Israel Hicks, John Hirsch,  Stephen Kanee, Michael Langham, Eugene Lion, Thomas MacAnna, Robert David MacDonald, Emily Mann, Philip Manor, Tom Moore, Steven Robman, Ken Ruta, Mark Schifter, Kenneth Welsh, David Wheeler

Actors (partial listing): Paul Ballantyne, Fran Bennett, James Blendick, Blair Brown, Barbara Bryne, Helen Carey, Len Cariou, Jeff Chandler, Patricia Conolly, David Feldshuh, Tovah Feldshuh, Peter Michael Goetz, Von Johnson, Charles Keating, Linda Kelsey, Nicholas Kepros, Mark Lamos, Karen Landry, Frank Langella, James Lawless, Robert Pastene, Richard Russell Ramos, Ken Ruta, Kenneth Welsh, Dianne Wiest

1970

Vineland Place
The Venetian Twins – by Carlo Goldoni, adapted by Robert David MacDonald
Ceremonies in Dark Old Men – by Lonne Elder III
The Tempest – by William Shakespeare
A Man's a Man – by Bertolt Brecht
A Play – by Aleksandr Solzhenitsyn, adapted by Paul Avila Mayer

The Other Place
Silence and Landscape – by Harold Pinter
Don Pimperlin's Love of Belisa in His Garden – by Federico García Lorca
Kumaliza – by C.L. Burton
The Madness of Lady Bright – by Lanford Wilson
Stars and Stripes Forever – by Fred Gaines
The  Labyrinth – by Fernando Arrabal
Winners – by Brian Friel
Baal – by Bertolt Brecht
Encore, Food for Thought, and A Mild Case of Death – by David Korr
Madam Popov and Wet Dream by God – by Gladden Schrock

1971–72

Vineland Place
Cyrano de Bergerac – by Edmond Rostand
The Taming of the Shrew – by William Shakespeare
A Touch of the Poet – by Eugene O'Neill
Misalliance – by George Bernard Shaw
The Diary of a Scoundrel – by Aleksandr Ostrovsky

On tour
Fables Here and Then – by David Feldshuh and Guthrie actors

1972–73

Vineland Place
A Midsummer Night's Dream – by William Shakespeare
Of Mice and Men – by John Steinbeck
The Relapse – by Sir John Vanbrugh
An Italian Straw Hat – by Eugène Labiche
Oedipus the King – by Sophocles
A Christmas Carol – by Charles Dickens
Cyrano, a new musical version – book and lyrics by Anthony Burgess, music by Michael J. Lewis

On tour
Of Mice and Men – by John Steinbeck

1973–74

Vineland Place
Becket – by Jean Anouilh
Oedipus the King – by Sophocles
The Government Inspector – by Nikolai Gogol
Juno and the Paycock – by Seán O'Casey
I, Said the Fly – by June Havoc
Waiting for Godot – by Samuel Beckett
The Merchant of Venice – by William Shakespeare
The Miracle Man – by Erik Brogger, adapted from Molière

On tour
The Portable Pioneer and Prairie Show – by David Chambers and Mel Marvin

1974–75

Vineland Place
King Lear – by William Shakespeare
Love's Labour's Lost – by William Shakespeare
The Crucible – by Arthur Miller
Tartuffe – by Molière
The School for Scandal – by Richard Brinsley Sheridan

On tour
Everyman – by Anonymous

1975–76

Vineland Place
Arsenic and Old Lace – by Joseph Kesselring
The Caretaker – by Harold Pinter
A Streetcar Named Desire – by Tennessee Williams
Loot – by Joe Orton
Mother Courage – by Bertolt Brecht
Under Milk Wood – by Dylan Thomas
Private Lives – by Noël Coward
A Christmas Carol – by Charles Dickens
Measure for Measure – by William Shakespeare

1976–77

Vineland Place
The Matchmaker – by Thornton Wilder
Doctor Faustus – by Christopher Marlowe
Cat on a Hot Tin Roof – by Tennessee Williams
Rosencrantz and Guildenstern Are Dead – by Tom Stoppard
An Enemy of the People – by Henrik Ibsen
The Winter's Tale – by William Shakespeare
A Christmas Carol – by Charles Dickens
The National Health – by Peter Nichols

Guthrie 2
The Collected Works of Billy the Kid – by Michael Ondaatje
The Future Pit – by Menzies McKillop
Anulla Allen – Autobiography of a Survivor – by Emily Mann and Anulla Allen
Triple bill:
Cold – by Michael Casale
Glutt – by Gladden Schrock
Waterman – by Frank B. Ford
Pilk's Madhouse – adapted by Ken Campbell
Up the Seminole – by Keane Bonath
Hello and Goodbye – by Athol Fugard
Open Shut – by Robert Hellman

On tour
A Party for Two – by Dominique Serrand and Barbara Berlovitz

1977–78

Vineland Place
She Stoops to Conquer – by Oliver Goldsmith
A Moon for the Misbegotten – by Eugene O'Neill
La Ronde – by Arthur Schnitzler
Catsplay – by István Örkény
The White Devil – by John Webster
Design for Living – by Noël Coward
A Christmas Carol – by Charles Dickens
Pantagleize – by Michel de Ghelderode

Guthrie 2
Ashes – by David Rudkin
Mouth on Fire, Not I, Play, and Krapp's Last Tape – by Samuel Beckett
The Conversion of Aaron Weiss – by Mark Medoff
Dear Liar – by Jerome Kilty
Dark Pony and Reunion – by David Mamet

On tour
A Moon for the Misbegotten – by Eugene O'Neill
Clowns, Lovers & Kings – by Tom Hegg and Susan Dafoe

1978–79

Vineland Place
The Pretenders – by Henrik Ibsen
Teibele and Her Demon – by Isaac Bashevis Singer and Eve Friedman
Boy Meets Girl – by Samuel and Bella Spewack
Bonjour, là, bonjour – by Michel Tremblay
Hamlet – by William Shakespeare
Marriage – by Nikolai Gogol, adapted by Barbara Field
A Christmas Carol – by Charles Dickens
The Beggar's Opera – by John Gay

Guthrie 2
Flashbacks: Christmas Past, Christmas Present – adapted by Scott Rubsam and Gail Smogard
My Cup Runneth Over – by Robert Patrick
Surprise, Surprise – by Michel Tremblay
Vienna Notes – by Richard Nelson
Litko – by David Mamet
On Mount Chimbarazo – by Tankred Dorst
Angel, Honey, Baby, Darling Dear – by Robert Patrick
A Kurt Weill Cabaret
Martha Schlamme in Concert
Little Eyolf – by Henrik Ibsen
Émigrés – by Sławomir Mrożek

On tour
Marriage – by Nikolai Gogol, adapted by Barbara Field

1979–80

Vineland Place
The Rivals – by Richard Brinsley Sheridan
Right of Way – by Richard Lees
The Glass Menagerie – by Tennessee Williams
Monsieur de Molière – by Mikhail Bulgakov
Endgame – by Samuel Beckett
Romeo and Juliet – by William Shakespeare
A Christmas Carol – by Charles Dickens
You Can't Take It With You – by George Kaufman and Moss Hart

On tour
The Glass Menagerie – by Tennessee Williams
Americana – adapted by Scott Rubsam
I Remember – by Stephen Willems
Even as the Sun – by Warren Green

1980s
Artistic Directors: Liviu Ciulei (1980–85), Garland Wright (1985–95)

Stages: Thrust stage on Vineland Place, Guthrie Lab (black box) in the Warehouse District

Directors (Vineland Place): JoAnne Akalaitis, Kazimierz Braun, Lee Breuer, Edward Payson Call, Liviu Ciulei, Jon Cranney, Howard Dallin, Robert Falls, Richard Foreman, Kenneth Frankel, Athol Fugard, William Gaskill, Edward Gilbert, Gary Gisselman, Derek Goldby, Edward Hastings, Douglas Hughes, Michael Kahn, Stephen Kanee, George Keathley, Michael Langham, Michael Maggio, Emily Mann, Christopher Markle, Marshall W. Mason, Patrick Mason, Vivian Matalon, Tony Mockus, Timothy Near, Richard Ooms, Lucian Pintilie, Peter Sellars, Andrei Şerban, Harold Stone, Douglas Turner Ward, Les Waters, Stan Wojewodski Jr., Garland Wright

1980–81

Vineland Place
Wild Oats – by John O'Keefe
Camille – by Alexandre Dumas, fils
The Tavern – by George M. Cohan
Desire Under the Elms – by Eugene O'Neill
Mary Stuart – by Friedrich Schiller
A Christmas Carol – by Charles Dickens
Arms and the Man – by George Bernard Shaw
Macbeth – by William Shakespeare

On tour
The Tavern – by George M. Cohan
A Midsummer Night's Dream – by William Shakespeare, adapted by Stephen Willems
Soldiering – by Stephen Willems

1981–82

Vineland Place
The Tempest – by William Shakespeare
Don Juan – by Molière
Our Town –  by Thornton Wilder
Foxfire – by Hume Cronyn and Susan Cooper
Eve of Retirement – by Thomas Bernhard
Eli: A Mystery Play – by Nelly Sachs
A Christmas Carol – by Charles Dickens
Candide – by Len Jenkin, adapted from the novel by Voltaire
As You Like It – by William Shakespeare

On tour
The Rainmaker – by N. Richard Nash
Trouble Begins at Eight: A Mark Twain Offering – by Christopher Markle

1982–83

Vineland Place
Summer Vacation Madness – by Carlo Goldoni
Requiem for a Nun – by William Faulkner
The Marriage of Figaro – by Beaumarchais
Room Service – by Jon Murray and Allen Boretz
Heartbreak House – by George Bernard Shaw
A Christmas Carol – by Charles Dickens
Entertaining Mr. Sloane – by Joe Orton
Peer Gynt – by Henrik Ibsen

On tour
Talley's Folly – by Lanford Wilson

1983–84

Vineland Place
"Master Harold"...and the Boys – by Athol Fugard
The Threepenny Opera – by Bertolt Brecht and Kurt Weill
Guys and Dolls – by Damon Runyon
The Entertainer – by John Osborne
The Seagull – by Anton Chekhov
A Christmas Carol – by Charles Dickens
The Importance of Being Earnest – by Oscar Wilde
Hedda Gabler – by Henrik Ibsen

On tour
The Importance of Being Earnest – by Oscar Wilde

1984–85

Vineland Place
A Soldier's Play – by Charles Fuller
Hang on to Me – songs by George Gershwin and Ira Gershwin, book by Maxim Gorky
Three Sisters – by Anton Chekhov
Tartuffe – by Molière
'Night Mother – by Marsha Norman
Twelfth Night – by William Shakespeare
A Christmas Carol – by Charles Dickens
Anything Goes – by Cole Porter

On tour
Foxfire – by Hume Cronyn and Susan Cooper

1985–86

Vineland Place
Great Expectations – by Charles Dickens
Cyrano de Bergerac – by Edmond Rostand
A Midsummer Night's Dream – by William Shakespeare
Candida – by George Bernard Shaw
Execution of Justice – by Emily Mann
A Christmas Carol – by Charles Dickens
On the Razzle – by Tom Stoppard
The Rainmaker – by N. Richard Nash

On tour
Great Expectations – by Charles Dickens, adapted by Barbara Field

1986–87

Vineland Place
Saint Joan – by George Bernard Shaw
The Merry Wives of Windsor – by William Shakespeare
The Birthday Party – by Harold Pinter
On the Verge – by Eric Overmeyer
Rhinoceros – by Eugène Ionesco
A Christmas Carol – by Charles Dickens
Double Infidelities – by Pierre Marivaux
The Gospel at Colonus – by Lee Breuer

1987–88

Vineland Place
The Misanthrope – by Molière
The Piggy Bank – by Eugène Labiche & Alfred Delacour
The Bacchae – by Euripides
The House of Bernarda Alba – by Federico García Lorca
Leon & Lena (and Lenz) – by Georg Buchner
A Christmas Carol – by Charles Dickens
Richard III – by William Shakespeare

1988–89

Vineland Place
The Glass Menagerie – by Tennessee Williams
The Imaginary Invalid – by Molière
Frankenstein – Playing with Fire – by Barbara Field
Hamlet – by William Shakespeare
The Wild Duck – by Henrik Ibsen
A Christmas Carol – by Charles Dickens
Pravda – by David Hare and Howard Brenton

Guthrie Lab
Cymbeline – by William Shakespeare

1989–90

Vineland Place
Harvey – by Mary Chase
Uncle Vanya – by Anton Chekhov
The Duchess of Malfi – by John Webster
Volpone – by Ben Jonson
The Screens – by Jean Genet
A Christmas Carol – by Charles Dickens
Candide – by Hugh Wheeler and Leonard Bernstein

Guthrie Lab
Measure for Measure – by William Shakespeare

1990s
Artistic Directors: Garland Wright (1985–95), Joe Dowling (1995–2015)

Stages: Thrust stage on Vineland Place, Guthrie Lab (black box)

Directors (Vineland Place): JoAnne Akalaitis, Libby Appel, Lou Bellamy, Michael Bogdanov, Risa Brainin, Mark Brokaw, Joe Dowling, Michael Engler, Sheldon Epps, David Esbjornson, David Gordon, Douglas Hughes, Bill T. Jones, Sari Ketter, Michael Langham, Marion McClinton, Conall Morrison, Neil Munro, Charles Newell, Richard Ooms, Dominique Serrand, Bartlett Sher, Kristoffer Tabori, David Thacker, Jennifer Tipton, Douglas C. Wager, Laird Williamson, Robert Woodruff, Garland Wright

1990–91

Vineland Place
Richard II – by William Shakespeare
Henry IV – by William Shakespeare
Henry V – by William Shakespeare
The Skin of Our Teeth – by Thornton Wilder
The Front Page – by Ben Hecht and Charles MacArthur
A Christmas Carol – by Charles Dickens
Medea – by Euripides

Guthrie Lab
Troilus and Cressida – by William Shakespeare

1991–92

Vineland Place
Death of a Salesman – by Arthur Miller
The Man Who Came to Dinner – by George Kaufman and Moss Hart
The Illusion – by Pierre Corneille
Fantasio – by Alfred de Musset
The Tempest – by William Shakespeare
A Christmas Carol – by Charles Dickens
Marat/Sade – by Peter Weiss

Guthrie Lab
Pericles – by William Shakespeare

1992–93

Vineland Place
Iphigeneia at Aulis – by Euripides
Agamemnon – by Aeschylus
Electra – by Sophocles
Private Lives – by Noël Coward
The Winter's Tale – by William Shakespeare
The Seagull – by Anton Chekhov
A Christmas Carol – by Charles Dickens
The Good Hope – by Herman Heijermans

Guthrie Lab
The Merchant of Venice – by William Shakespeare

1993–94

Vineland Place
Too Clever by Half – by Alexander Ostrovski
Naga Mandala – by Girish Karnad
The Triumph of Love – by Pierre Marivaux
Othello – by William Shakespeare
A Christmas Carol – by Charles Dickens
A Woman of No Importance – by Oscar Wilde
Dream on Monkey Mountain – by Derek Walcott

Guthrie Lab
Peer Gynt – by Henrik Ibsen

1994–95

Vineland Place
The Rover – by Aphra Behn
The Play's the Thing – by Ferenc Molnár
Home – by David Storey
The Broken Jug – by Heinrich von Kleist
As You Like It – by William Shakespeare
A Christmas Carol – by Charles Dickens
Macbeth – by William Shakespeare
K: Impressions of The Trial – by Franz Kafka

Guthrie Lab
Mother Courage and Her Children – by Bertolt Brecht

1995–96

Vineland Place
King Lear – by William Shakespeare
The Royal Family – by George Kaufman and Edna Ferber
The Firebugs – by Max Frisch
Big White Fog – by Theodore Ward
A Christmas Carol – by Charles Dickens
Babes in Arms – by Richard Rodgers and Lorenz Hart

Guthrie Lab
Short Plays:
Tone Clusters – by Joyce Carol Oates
Naomi in the Living Room – by Christopher Durang
The Zoo Story – by Edward Albee
Old Times – by Harold Pinter
K: Impressions of The Trial (revival) – by Franz Kafka

1996–97

Vineland Place
The Cherry Orchard – by Anton Chekhov
She Stoops to Conquer – by Oliver Goldsmith
Philadelphia, Here I Come! – by Brian Friel
A Doll's House – by Henrik Ibsen
A Christmas Carol – by Charles Dickens
The Price – by Arthur Miller
A Midsummer Night's Dream – by William Shakespeare

Guthrie Lab
Simpatico – by Sam Shepard
Mystery of the Rose Bouquet – by Manuel Puig
Many Colors Make the Thunder-King – by Femi Osofisan

1997–98

Vineland Place
You Can't Take It with You – by George Kaufman and Moss Hart
Blithe Spirit – by Noël Coward
Racing Demon – by David Hare
A Christmas Carol – by Charles Dickens
The Playboy of the Western World – by John Millington Synge
Thunder Knocking on the Door – by Keith Glover
Much Ado About Nothing – by William Shakespeare

Guthrie Lab
Black No More – by Syl Jones

1998–99

Vineland Place
The Importance of Being Earnest – by Oscar Wilde
A Month in the Country – by Brian Friel
The Venetian Twins – by Carlo Goldoni
A Christmas Carol – by Charles Dickens
The Magic Fire – by Lillian Garrett-Groag
Julius Caesar – by William Shakespeare
Summer and Smoke – by Tennessee Williams

Guthrie Lab
Molly Sweeney – by Brian Friel
Gross Indecency – by Moisés Kaufman
Lysistrata – by Aristophanes

1999–2000

Vineland Place
The School for Scandal – by Richard Brinsley Sheridan
Ah, Wilderness! – by Eugene O'Neill
Martin Guerre – by Alain Boublil and Claude-Michel Schönberg
A Christmas Carol – by Charles Dickens
Misalliance – by George Bernard Shaw
The Darker Face of the Earth – by Rita Dove
The Plough and the Stars – by Seán O'Casey

Guthrie Lab
Sweeney Todd – music and lyrics by Stephen Sondheim, book by Hugh Wheeler
Mr. Peters' Connections – by Arthur Miller
Lake Hollywood – by John Guare
Side Man – by Warren Leight

On tour
A Midsummer Night's Dream – by William Shakespeare

2000s
Artistic Director: Joe Dowling (1995–2015)

Stages: Thrust stage on Vineland Place, Guthrie Lab, Wurtele Thrust Stage, McGuire Proscenium Stage, Dowling Studio (black box)

Directors

Thrust stage: Michael Bogdanov, Timothy Bond, Tim Carroll, Joe Dowling, David Esbjornson, Leigh Fondakowski, Gary Gisselman, Doug Hughes, Sari Ketter, Mark Lamos, Marcela Lorca, Ethan McSweeny, John Miller-Stephany, Lisa Peterson, Peter Rothstein, Dominique Serrand, Casey Stangl, Douglas C. Wager

McGuire Proscenium Stage: Joe Dowling, Gary Gisselman, Wendy C. Goldberg, Michael Greif, Mark Lamos, Marcela Lorca, Lisa Peterson, Peter Rothstein, Rob Ruggiero, Casey Stangl, Susan Stroman, Francesca Zambello

2000–01

Vineland Place
Twelfth Night – by William Shakespeare 
Hedda Gabler – by Henrik Ibsen 
To Fool the Eye – adaptation by Jeffrey Hatcher of Léocadia by Jean Anouilh 
A Christmas Carol – by Charles Dickens
Who's Afraid of Virginia Woolf? – by Edward Albee 
Hamlet – by William Shakespeare (a Royal National Theatre production presented by the Guthrie Theater)
Once in a Lifetime – by Moss Hart and George S. Kaufman

Guthrie Lab
The Invention of Love – by Tom Stoppard 
Blood Wedding – by Federico García Lorca
In the Blood – by Suzan-Lori Parks

On tour
Molly Sweeney – by Brian Friel

season play guides

2001–02

Vineland Place
Amadeus – by Peter Shaffer 
Da – by Hugh Leonard 
A Christmas Carol – by Charles Dickens
Antony and Cleopatra – by William Shakespeare 
The Canterbury Tales – by Geoffrey Chaucer 
All My Sons – by Arthur Miller

Guthrie Lab
The Carpetbagger's Children – by Horton Foote 
Merrily We Roll Along – music and lyrics by Stephen Sondheim, book by George Furth 
Thief River – by Lee Blessing

On tour
Ah, Wilderness! – by Eugene O'Neill

season play guides

2002–03

Vineland Place
Resurrection Blues – by Arthur Miller
The Comedy of Errors – by William Shakespeare 
A Christmas Carol – by Charles Dickens 
Mrs. Warren's Profession – by George Bernard Shaw 
Six Degrees of Separation – by John Guare 
Three Sisters – by Anton Chekhov

Guthrie Lab
Good Boys – by Jane Martin
The Chairs – by Eugène Ionesco 
Wintertime – by Charles L. Mee 
Top Girls – by Caryl Churchill

On tour
The Stuff of Dreams – by Bill Corbett

season play guides

2003–04

Vineland Place
Pride and Prejudice – by Jane Austen 
The Night of the Iguana – by Tennessee Williams
Twelfth Night – by William Shakespeare (a Shakespeare's Globe production presented by the Guthrie WorldStage Series)
A Christmas Carol – by Charles Dickens 
Crowns – by Regina Taylor 
Romeo and Juliet – by William Shakespeare 
The Pirates of Penzance – by W.S. Gilbert and Arthur Sullivan

Guthrie Lab
Nickel and Dimed – by Joan Holden 
Othello – by William Shakespeare 
Boston Marriage – by David Mamet 
Blue/Orange – by Joe Penhall

Riverfront site of future (2006) theater building
Carmen Funebre – by production ensemble (a Teatr Biuro Podróży production presented by the Guthrie WorldStage Series and the Walker Arts Center)

On tour
Othello – by William Shakespeare

season play guides

2004–05

Vineland Place
Death of a Salesman – by Arthur Miller 
Pygmalion – by George Bernard Shaw 
A Christmas Carol – by Charles Dickens 
Oedipus – by Ellen McLaughlin 
As You Like It – by William Shakespeare 
She Loves Me – music by Jerry Bock, lyrics by Sheldon Harnick, book by Joe Masteroff

Guthrie Lab
Lady with a Lapdog – by Anton Chekhov 
4.48 Psychosis – by Sarah Kane (a Royal Court Theatre production presented by the Guthrie WorldStage Series)
The Sex Habits of American Women – by Julie Marie Myatt
Pericles – by William Shakespeare 
The Notebook and The Proof – by Agota Kristof (a De Onderneming Theatre production presented by the Guthrie WorldStage Series)
A Body of Water – by Lee Blessing

On tour
Death of a Salesman – by Arthur Miller 
Freezing Paradise: An Evening with Kevin Kling – by Kevin Kling

season play guides

2005–06

Vineland Place
His Girl Friday – by John Guare 
The Constant Wife – by W. Somerset Maugham 
Intimate Apparel – by Lynn Nottage 
Measure for Measure – by William Shakespeare (a Shakespeare's Globe production presented by the Guthrie WorldStage Series) 
A Christmas Carol – by Charles Dickens 
The People's Temple – by Leigh Fondakowski
Hamlet – by William Shakespeare

Guthrie Lab
Macbeth – by William Shakespeare (an Out of Joint Theatre Company production presented by the Guthrie WorldStage Series)

Pantages Theatre
Arlecchino: Servant of Two Masters – by Carlo Goldoni (a Piccolo Teatro di Milano production presented by the Guthrie WorldStage Series)

season play guides

2006–07

Wurtele Thrust Stage
The Great Gatsby – by F. Scott Fitzgerald
Lost in Yonkers – by Neil Simon
A Christmas Carol – by Charles Dickens
The Merchant of Venice – by William Shakespeare
1776 – music and lyrics by Sherman Edwards, book by Peter Stone

McGuire Proscenium Stage
DruidSynge – by John Millington Synge (a Druid Theatre Company production presented by the Guthrie WorldStage Series)
The Real Thing – by Tom Stoppard
Edgardo Mine – by Alfred Uhry
The Glass Menagerie – by Tennessee Williams
Major Barbara – by George Bernard Shaw

Dowling Studio
The Falls – by Jeffrey Hatcher
Circle Around the Island – by Marcus Quiniones
B.F.A Actor Training Program Class of 2007:
Lizards ... by Megan Mostyn-Brown
Shadowgrass by Dan Dietz
Boats on a River – by Julie Marie Myatt

season play guides

2007–08

Wurtele Thrust Stage
Jane Eyre – by Charlotte Brontë, adapted by Alan Stanford
King Lear – by William Shakespeare (a Royal Shakespeare Company production presented by the Guthrie WorldStage Series)
The Seagull – by Anton Chekov (a Royal Shakespeare Company production presented by the Guthrie WorldStage Series)
A Christmas Carol – by Charles Dickens, adapted by Barbara Field
Peer Gynt – by Henrik Ibsen, translated and adapted by Robert Bly
A Midsummer Night's Dream – by William Shakespeare
The Government Inspector – by Nikolai Gogol, adapted by Jeffrey Hatcher

McGuire Proscenium Stage
Private Lives – by Noël Coward
The Home Place – by Brian Friel
Third – by Wendy Wasserstein
 Secret Fall of Constance Wilde – by Thomas Kilroy

Dowling Studio
Pen – by David Marshall Grant
9 Parts of Desire – by Heather Raffo
B.F.A Actor Training Program Class of 2008:
Be Here Now – by Carson Kreitzer
When I Was a Ghost – by Deborah Stein
The End – by Sheri Wilner
French Twist – choreographed by Joe Chvala (a Flying Foot Forum production presented by the Guthrie Theater)
The Ugly One – by Marius von Mayenburg, translated by Maja Zade
After a Hundred Years – by Naomi Iizuka
season play guides

2008–09

Wurtele Thrust Stage
A View from the Bridge – by Arthur Miller
A Christmas Carol – by Charles Dickens, adapted by Barbara Field
The Two Gentlemen of Verona – by William Shakespeare
Caroline, or Change – book and lyrics by Tony Kushner, music by Jeanine Tesori
When We Are Married – by J. B. Priestley

McGuire Proscenium Stage
Little House on the Prairie – based on the books by Laura Ingalls Wilder, book by Rachel Sheinkin, music by Rachel Portman, lyrics by Donna di Novelli 
Shadowlands – by William Nicholson
A Delicate Balance – by Edward Albee
The Intelligent Homosexual's Guide to Capitalism and Socialism with a Key to the Scriptures – by Tony Kushner

Dowling Studio
Old Wicked Songs – by Jon Marans (a Theater Latté Da production presented by the Guthrie Theater)
The Caretaker – by Harold Pinter
Blackbird – by David Harrower (a Pillsbury House Theatre production presented by the Guthrie Theater)
Henry V – by William Shakespeare, co-production with The Acting Company
Happy Days – by Samuel Beckett
By the Bog of Cats – by Marina Carr (a Frank Theatre production presented by the Guthrie Theater)
B.F.A Actor Training Program Class of 2009:
Writer 1272 – by Vincent Delaney
What May Fall – by Peter Gil-Sheridan
Tiny Kushner: An evening of short plays by Tony Kushner
My Father's Bookshelf – a collaborative creation by  Live Action Set (a Live Action Set production presented by the Guthrie Theater)

season play guides

2009–10

Wurtele Thrust Stage
The Importance of Being Earnest – by Oscar Wilde
A Christmas Carol – by Charles Dickens, adapted by Barbara Field
Macbeth – by William Shakespeare
M. Butterfly – by David Henry Hwang
A Streetcar Named Desire – by Tennessee Williams

McGuire Proscenium Stage
Ella – book by Jeffrey Hatcher, conceived by Rob Ruggiero and Dyke Garrison
Faith Healer – by Brian Friel
Romeo and Juliet – by William Shakespeare, co-production with The Acting Company
Brief Encounter – by Noël Coward, adapted by Emma Rice (a Kneehigh Theatre production presented by the Guthrie WorldStage Series)
Dollhouse – by Rebecca Gilman, based on A Doll's House by Henrik Ibsen
The Scottsboro Boys – music by John Kander, lyrics by Fred Ebb, book by David Thompson

Dowling Studio
Super Monkey – by production ensemble (a Jon Ferguson Theater production presented by the Guthrie Theater)
Tales from the Book of Longing – concept by Stuart Pimsler and Suzanne Costello (a Stuart Pimsler Dance & Theater production presented by the Guthrie Theater)
Northern Lights/Southern Cross: Tales from the Other Side of the World – by Kevin Kling, music by Pat Rix (an Interact Theater production in collaboration with Tutti Ensemble presented by the Guthrie Theater)
Violet – music by Jeanine Tesori, lyrics and book by Brian Crawley, based on "The Ugliest Pilgrim" by Doris Betts (a Theater Latte Da production presented by the Guthrie Theater)
Coward's Women – music by Noël Coward, concept by Michael Todaro (a Producing House production presented by the Guthrie Theater)
Yellow Face – by David Henry Hwang (a Mu Performing Arts production presented by the Guthrie Theater)
B.F.A Actor Training Program Class of 2010:
Tiny Disasters – by Cory Hinkle and the cast and director
Circle Mirror Transformation – by Annie Baker

Walker Art Center's McGuire Theater
The Walworth Farce – by Enda Walsh (a Druid Theatre production presented by the Guthrie WorldStage Series and the Walker Art Center)

season play guides

2010s
Artistic Directors: Joe Dowling (1995–2015), Joseph Haj (2015–present)

Stages: Wurtele Thrust Stage, McGuire Proscenium Stage, Dowling Studio

Directors

Wurtele Thrust Stage: Libby Appel, Lou Bellamy, Lileana Blain-Cruz, David Bolger, Timothy Bond, Gary Gisselman, Joe Chvala, Joe Dowling, Wendy Goldberg, Joseph Haj, Lavina Jadhwani, Lauren Keating, Marcela Lorca, Christopher Luscombe, Marion McClinton, Ethan McSweeny, Rob Melrose, John Miller-Stephany, Jonathan Munby, Lisa Peterson, Roger Rees, Sarah Rasmussen, Blake Robison, Leigh Silverman, Francesca Zambello,  Mary Zimmerman

McGuire Proscenium Stage:  Maria Aitken, Christopher Bayes, Ian Belknap, Lou Bellamy, Desdemona Chiang, Rachel Chavkin, Valerie Curtis-Newton, Joe Dowling, David Esbjornson, Wendy Goldberg, Ramin Gray, Joseph Haj, David Ivers, Terry Johnson, Michael Kahn, Marcela Lorca, Taibi Magar, Meredith McDonough, Patricia McGregor, Ethan McSweeny, Jeffrey Meanza, John Miller-Stephany, Lisa Peterson, John Rando, Emma Rice, Lisa Rothe, Peter Rothstein, Mark Rucker, Mark Rylance, Joel Sass, Dominique Serrand, Casey Stangl, Max Stafford-Clark, Lyndsey Turner, Claire van Kampen, Kate Whoriskey, Mary Zimmerman

2010–11

Wurtele Thrust Stage
The Master Butchers Singing Club – adapted by Marsha Norman from the book by Louise Erdrich
A Christmas Carol – by Charles Dickens, adapted by Crispin Whittell
The Winter's Tale – by William Shakespeare
Arsenic and Old Lace – by Joseph Kesselring
H.M.S. Pinafore – by Gilbert and Sullivan

McGuire Proscenium Stage
The Great Game: Afghanistan – by Richard Bean, Lee Blessing, David Edgar, David Greig, Amit Gupta, Ron Hutchinson, Stephen Jeffreys, Abi Morgan, Ben Ockrent, Simon Stephens, Colin Teevan and Joy Wilkinson (a Tricycle Theatre production presented by the Guthrie WorldStage Series)
The 39 Steps – adapted by Patrick Barlow
Ma Rainey's Black Bottom – by August Wilson (a Penumbra Theatre Company production presented by the Guthrie Theater)
Arms and the Man – by George Bernard Shaw
God of Carnage – by Yasmina Reza

Dowling Studio
Cowboy Versus Samurai – by Michael Golamco (a Mu Performing Arts production presented by the Guthrie Theater)
Little Eyes – by Cory Hinkle (a Workhaus Collective production presented by the Guthrie Theater)
Song of Extinction – by EM Lewis (a Theater Latté Da production presented by the Guthrie Theater)
Heaven – music by Chan Poling (a Flying Foot Forum production presented by the Guthrie Theater)
B.F.A Actor Training Program Class of 2011:
THE ORESTEIA VARIATIONS, based on the Oresteia trilogy:
Until We See Three of Everything – by Cory Hinkle
Reverb – by Mat Smart

season play guides

2011–12

Wurtele Thrust Stage
Much Ado About Nothing – by William Shakespeare
A Christmas Carol – by Charles Dickens, adapted by Crispin Whittell
Cat on a Hot Tin Roof – by Tennessee Williams
Hay Fever – by Noël Coward
The Amen Corner – by James Baldwin  (A Penumbra Theatre Company production presented by the Guthrie Theater)
The Sunshine Boys – by Neil Simon

McGuire Proscenium Stage
The Burial at Thebes – by Seamus Heaney
Charley's Aunt – by Brandon Thomas
End of the Rainbow – by Peter Quilter
Time Stands Still – by Donald Margulies
Roman Holiday –  music and lyrics by Cole Porter, book by Paul Blake, based on the Paramount Pictures motion picture

Dowling Studio
The Edge Of Our Bodies – by Adam Rapp
Julius Caesar  – by William Shakespeare  (The Acting Company in association with the Guthrie Theater)
The Birds – by Conor McPherson, from the short story by Daphne du Maurier
B.F.A Actor Training Program Class of 2012:
O BRAVE NEW WORLD, based on Shakespeare's The Tempest:
Golden Age – by Gregory S. Moss
In Game or Real – by Victoria Stewart
Are You Now or Have You Ever Been... – by Carlyle Brown (a Carlyle Brown & Company production presented by the Guthrie Theater).
Anytown – music by Bruce Springsteen and the E Street Band (a Shapiro & Smith Dance production presented by the Guthrie Theater)
Swimming with My Mother – concept by David Bolger (a CoisCéim Dance Theatre production presented by the Guthrie WorldStage Series)
Trick Boxing – by Brian Sostek and Megan McClellan (a Sossy Mechanics production presented by the Guthrie Theater)
The Brothers Size – by Tarell Alvin McCraney (a Pillsbury House Theatre and Mount Curve Company production presented by the Guthrie Theater)

season play guides

2012–13

Wurtele Thrust Stage
Tales from Hollywood – by Christopher Hampton
A Christmas Carol – by Charles Dickens, adapted by Crispin Whittell
Long Day's Journey into Night – by Eugene O’Neill
Twelfth Night – by William Shakespeare (a Propeller production presented by the Guthrie WorldStage Series)
The Taming of the Shrew – by William Shakespeare (a Propeller production presented by the Guthrie WorldStage Series)
The Primrose Path – by Crispin Whittell, based on the novel Home of the Gentry by Ivan Turgenev
Pride and Prejudice – adapted by Simon Reade from the book by Jane Austen

McGuire Proscenium Stage
Appomattox – by Christopher Hampton
The Servant of Two Masters – by Carlo Goldoni, adapted by Constance Congdon from a translation by Christina Sibul (a Yale Repertory Theatre production presented by the Guthrie Theater)
Other Desert Cities – by Jon Robin Baitz
Nice Fish – by Mark Rylance and Louis Jenkins, based on the poetry of Louis Jenkins
Clybourne Park – by Bruce Norris

Dowling Studio
Embers – by Christopher Hampton, based on the novel by Sándor Márai as translated by Carol Brown Janeway
As You Like It – by William Shakespeare  (The Acting Company in association with the Guthrie Theater)
Buzzer – by Tracey Scott Wilson (a Pillsbury House Theatre production presented by the Guthrie Theater)
B.F.A Actor Training Program Class of 2013:
Those Who Favor Fire – by Aditi Brennan Kapil
South Street – by Carson Kreitzer
Yellow Fever – by R.A. Shiomi (a Mu Performing Arts production presented by the Guthrie Theater)

season play guides

2013–14

Wurtele Thrust Stage
Uncle Vanya – by Anton Chekov
A Christmas Carol – by Charles Dickens, adapted by Crispin Whittell
Othello – by William Shakespeare 
Crimes of the Heart – by Beth Henley 
My Fair Lady – book and lyrics by Alan Jay Lerner, music by Frederick Loewe

McGuire Proscenium Stage
Tribes – by Nina Raine
Born Yesterday – by Garson Kanin
Tristan and Yseult – by Anna Maria Murphy and Carl Grose, adapted by Emma Rice (a Kneehigh Theatre production presented by the Guthrie WorldStage Series)
The Mountaintop – by Katori Hall (a Penumbra Theatre Company production presented by the Guthrie Theater)
Hamlet – by William Shakespeare (The Acting Company in association with the Guthrie Theater)
Rosencrantz and Guildenstern Are Dead – by Tom Stoppard (The Acting Company in association with the Guthrie Theater)
Our Country's Good – by Timberlake Wertenbaker (an Out of Joint and Octagon Theatre Bolton production presented by the Guthrie WorldStage Series)
Vanya and Sonia and Masha and Spike – by Christopher Durang

Dowling Studio
Moon Show 143 – by Kyle Loven (presented by the Guthrie Theater)
How to be a Korean Woman – written and performed by Sun Mee Chomet (presented by the Guthrie Theater)
An Iliad – by Lisa Peterson and Denis O'Hare, adapted from Homer as translated by Robert Fagles
Skiing on Broken Glass – by David Goldstein
Freud's Last Session – by Mark St. Germain
Abe Lincoln and Uncle Tom in the White House – by Carlyle Brown (a Carlyle Brown & Company production presented by the Guthrie Theater)
B.F.A Actor Training Program Class of 2014:
Peter Piper – by Trista Baldwin
The Hidden People: Part One – by Joe Waechter
The Three Musketeers – by John Heimbuch, adapted from the novel by Alexandre Dumas (a Walking Shadow Theatre Company production presented by the Guthrie Theater)

2014–15

Wurtele Thrust Stage
The Heidi Chronicles – by Wendy Wasserstein
A Christmas Carol – by Charles Dickens, adapted by Crispin Whittell
A Midsummer Night's Dream – by William Shakespeare
The Crucible – by Arthur Miller
The Music Man – music, lyrics, and book by Meredith Willson, story by Meredith Willson and Franklin Lacey

McGuire Proscenium Stage
The White Snake – by Mary Zimmerman, based on the Chinese fable
The Cocktail Hour – by A. R. Gurney
Mr. Burns, a Post-Electric Play – by Anne Washburn
Juno and the Paycock – by Seán O'Casey
Stage Kiss – by Sarah Ruhl

Dowling Studio
Marcus, or the Secret of Sweet – by Tarell Alvin McCraney (a Pillsbury House Theatre and Mount Curve Company production presented by the Guthrie Theater)
A Steady Rain – by Keith Huff (an Odyssey Theatre Ensemble production presented by the Guthrie Theater)
Relics – an immersive performance created by Sarah Agnew, Nick Golfis and Chantal Pavageaux (presented by the Guthrie Theater)
Jonah and the Whale: A New Musical – book by Tyler Mills, music and lyrics by David Darrow and Blake Thomas (a 7th House Theater production presented by the Guthrie Theater)
A Connecticut Yankee in King Arthur's Court – by Jeffrey Hatcher, adapted from the novel by Mark Twain (The Acting Company in association with the Guthrie Theater)
Telling: Minnesota 2015 – The Telling Project presented by the Guthrie Theater
The Nature Crown – conceived by Jon Ferguson, with text by Dominic Orlando (a Theatre Forever production presented by the Guthrie Theater)
Macbeth – by William Shakespeare (The Acting Company in association with the Guthrie Theater)
B.F.A Actor Training Program Class of 2015:
Blue Stockings – by Jessica Swale
Snapshots – a series of scenes from the dramatic canon
Choir Boy – by Tarell Alvin McCraney

2015–16

Wurtele Thrust Stage
To Kill a Mockingbird – adapted by Christopher Sergel, based on the novel by Harper Lee
A Christmas Carol – by Charles Dickens, adapted by Crispin Whittell
Pericles –  by William Shakespeare (in association with Oregon Shakespeare Festival and The Folger Theatre)
A 24-Decade History of Popular Music: The 20th Century Abridged - by Taylor Mac (Singular Voices/Plural Perspectives series) 
Harvey - by Mary Chase
South Pacific - music by Richard Rodgers, lyrics by Oscar Hammerstein II, book by Oscar Hammerstein II and Joshua Logan

McGuire Proscenium Stage
The Events – by David Greig (an Actors Touring Company production presented by the Guthrie WorldStage Series)
The Cocoanuts – music and lyrics by Irving Berlin, book by George S. Kaufman, adapted by Gregg Coffin
Two one-act comedies (in association with Shakespeare Theatre Company):
The Critic – by Richard Brinsley Sheridan, adapted by Jeffrey Hatcher
The Real Inspector Hound – by Tom Stoppard
Trouble in Mind - by Alice Childress
Disgraced - by Ayad Akhtar

Dowling Studio
The Genealogy of Happenstance – by Allegra J Lingo (presented by the Guthrie Theater)
U/G/L/Y – by Shá Cage (a Freestyle Theatre production presented by the Guthrie Theater)
Wrestling Jerusalem – by Aaron Davidman (Singular Voices/Plural Perspectives series)
The Great Work – book by Grant Sorenson, music and lyrics by David Darrow (a 7th House Theater production presented by the Guthrie Theater)
The Amish Project – by Jessica Dickey (Singular Voices/Plural Perspectives series)
You for Me for You – by Mia Chung (a Mu Performing Arts production presented by the Guthrie Theater)
B.F.A Actor Training Program Class of 2016:
Earthquakes in London – by Mike Bartlett
Snapshots – a series of scenes from the dramatic canon
Telling: Minnesota 2016 – The Telling Project presented by the Guthrie Theater
The Ingenious Gentleman Don Quixote of La Mancha - conceived and created by the company (A Four Humors production presented by the Guthrie Theater)
Steven Mackey: Orpheus Unsung - conceived by Mark DeChiazza (presented by the Guthrie Theater and the Saint Paul Chamber Orchestra's Liquid Music)

2016–17

Wurtele Thrust Stage
Sense and Sensibility – adapted by Kate Hamill, based on the novel by Jane Austen
A Christmas Carol – by Charles Dickens, adapted by Crispin Whittell
King Lear – by William Shakespeare
The Bluest Eye – adapted by Lydia R. Diamond, based on the novel by Toni Morrison
Sunday in the Park with George – music and lyrics by Stephen Sondheim, book by James Lapine

McGuire Proscenium Stage
The Parchman Hour: Songs and Stories of the '61 Freedom Riders – by Mike Wiley 
The Lion in Winter – by James Goldman 
The Royal Family – by George S. Kaufman and Edna Ferber
Battlefield – adapted by Peter Brook and Marie-Hélène Estienne, based on the Mahabharata and the play by Jean-Claude Carrière (presented by the Guthrie WorldStage Series)
Refugia – an original idea developed by The Moving Company
Native Gardens – by Karen Zacarias

Dowling Studio
The Trump Card – by Mike Daisey (presented by the Guthrie Theater)
Home Street Home – by zAmya Theater troupe with playwright Josef Evans (a zAmya Theater Project production presented by the Guthrie Theater)
Hold These Truths – by Jeanne Sakata
The Passage, or What Comes of Searching in the Dark – book, music, and lyrics by David Darrow (a 7th House Theater production presented by the Guthrie Theater)
Promise Land – by Transatlanic Love Affair (a Transatlantic Love Affair production presented by the Guthrie Theater)
We Are Proud to Present a Presentation About the Herero of Namibia, Formerly Known as Southwest Africa, From the German Sudwestafrika, Between the Years 1884–1915 – by Jackie Sibblies Drury
She Went To War – The Telling Project presented by the Guthrie Theater
B.F.A Actor Training Program Class of 2017:
The American Clock – by Arthur Miller
Charles Francis Chan Jr.'s Exotic Oriental Murder Mystery – by Lloyd Suh (a Mu Performing Arts production presented by the Guthrie Theater)
The New Griots Festival – founded by Josh Wilder and Jamil Jude (presented by the Guthrie Theater)
The Holler Sessions – by Frank Boyd

2017–18

Wurtele Thrust Stage
Romeo and Juliet – by William Shakespeare
A Christmas Carol – by Charles Dickens, adapted by Crispin Whittell
Indecent – by Paula Vogel
Guess Who's Coming to Dinner – by Todd Kreidler, based on the screenplay by William Rose
West Side Story – based on a conception by Jerome Robbins, music by Leonard Bernstein, lyrics by Stephen Sondheim, book by Arthur Laurents

McGuire Proscenium Stage
Watch on the Rhine – by Lillian Hellman
Leila's Death – by Ali Chahrour (presented by the Guthrie Theater and the Walker Arts Center)
Blithe Spirit – by Noël Coward
Familiar – by Danai Gurira
An Enemy of the People – based on the play by Henrik Ibsen, by Brad Birch
The Legend of Georgia McBride – by Matthew Lopez

Dowling Studio
Mala – by Melinda Lopez (an ArtsEmerson production presented by the Guthrie Theater)
Birds Sing Differently Here – created by Dylan Fresco, Taous Claire Khazem and Iraqi Voices program participants (an original theater piece presented by the Iraqi and American Reconciliation Project)
Solo Emerging Artist Celebration
Antonio Duke – Tears of the Moon
A.P. Lopez – Foray Softly
Ifrah Mansour – How to Have Fun in a Civil War
A People's History – by Mike Daisey (presented by the Guthrie Theater)
B.F.A Actor Training Program Class of 2018:
Argonautika – by Mary Zimmerman, adapted from The Voyage of Jason and the Argonauts
Under This Roof – by Barbara Kingsley (a Full Circle Theater production presented by the Guthrie Theater)
Not Every Mountain – by Rude Mechs (a Rude Mechs production presented by the Guthrie Theater)

Public spaces in the Guthrie
BAD NEWS! i was there... – by JoAnne Akalaitis (presented by the Guthrie Theater)

Walker Art Center's McGuire Theater
887 – by Robert Lepage (presented by the Guthrie Theater and the Walker Art Center)

2018–19

Wurtele Thrust Stage
Frankenstein - Playing with Fire – by Barbara Field, based on the novel Frankenstein by Mary Shelley
A Christmas Carol – by Charles Dickens, adapted by Crispin Whittell
As You Like It – by William Shakespeare
Metamorphoses – by Mary Zimmerman, based on the myths of Ovid
Guys and Dolls – based on a story and characters of Damon Runyon, music and lyrics by Frank Loesser, book by Jo Swerling and Abe Burrows

McGuire Proscenium Stage
Noises Off – by Michael Frayn
The Great Leap – by Lauren Yee
Cyrano de Bergerac – by Edmond Rostand, adapted by Joseph Haj
Floyd's – by Lynn Nottage

Dowling Studio
Two Degrees – by Tira Palmquist (an Prime Productions production presented by the Guthrie Theater)
Hot Funky Butt Jazz – by the Interact ensemble (an Interact production presented by the Guthrie Theater)
Get Used To It: A Celebration of Queer Artistry
Unexploded Ordnances (UXO) – by Lois Weaver, Peggy Shaw, and Hannah Maxwell (a Split Britches production presented by the Guthrie Theater)
Martha Graham Cracker's Lashed But Not Leashed – songs by Dito van Reigersberg, David Sweeny, Eliza Hardy, and Vince Federici (presented by the Guthrie Theater)
Hi, Are You Single? – by Ryan Haddad (presented by the Guthrie Theater)
Caught – by Christopher Chen (a Full Circle Theater production presented by the Guthrie Theater)
Leaves of Grass - Illuminated – by Patrick Scully from the text by Walt Whitman (presented by the Guthrie Theater)

2019–20

Wurtele Thrust Stage
The Glass Menagerie – by Tennessee Williams
A Christmas Carol – by Charles Dickens, adapted by Crispin Whittell
Twelfth Night – by William Shakespeare - 
Emma – based on the novel by Jane Austen - 
Cabaret – book by Joe Masteroff based on the play by John Van Druten and stories by Christopher Isherwood, music by John Kander, lyrics by Fred Ebb -

McGuire Proscenium Stage
Steel Magnolias – by Robert Harling
Noura – by Heather Raffo
The Bacchae – by Euripides, translation by Aaron Poochigian (a SITI Company production presented by the Guthrie) - 
Destiny of Desire – by Karen Zacarías - 
Sweat – by Lynn Nottage -

Dowling Studio
Zafira and the Resistance – by Kathryn Haddad (a New Arab American Theater Works production presented by the Guthrie Theater)
Fast Company – by Carla Ching (a Theatre Mu production presented by the Guthrie Theater)
Grey Rock – by Amir Nizar Zuabi (a Remote Theater Project production presented by the Guthrie Theater)
Jogging – by Hannane Hajj Ali (presented by the Guthrie Theater)

2020s
Artistic Directors: Joseph Haj (2015–present)

Stages: Wurtele Thrust Stage, McGuire Proscenium Stage, Dowling Studio

2020–21

References

External links
Guthrie Theater web site

Theatre company production histories